In human anatomy, the deltoid tuberosity is a rough, triangular area on the anterolateral (front-side) surface of the middle of the humerus. It is a site of attachment of deltoid muscle.

Structure

Variation
The deltoid tuberosity has been reported as very prominent in less than 10% of people.

Development
The deltoid tuberosity develops through endochondral ossification in a two-phase process.  The initiating signal is tendon-dependent, whilst the growth phase is muscle-dependent.

Clinical significance 
The deltoid tuberosity is at risk of avulsion fracture. These fractures may be managed conservatively with rest.

Other animals
In mammals, the humerus displays a wide morphological variation. The size and orientation of its functionally important features, including the deltoid tubercle, greater tubercle, and medial epicondyle, are pivotal to an animal's style of locomotion and habitat. In cursorial (running) animals such as the pronghorn, the deltoid tubercle is located about a quarter of the way down the shaft, which allows for rapid but relatively weak limb flexion and extension. In natatorial (swimming) animals such as the North American river otter, the tubercle is located nearly halfway down the shaft, which allows for powerful limb flexion and extension. The tuberosity can be very pronounced in fossorial (digging) animals, such as the mountain beaver. It is very superficial in horses.

References

Bones of the upper limb
Humerus